Nepticulidae is a family of very small moths with a worldwide distribution. They are characterised by eyecaps over the eyes (see also Opostegidae, Bucculatricidae, Lyonetiidae). These pigmy moths or midget moths, as they are commonly known, include the smallest of all living moths, with a wingspan that can be as little as 3 mm in the case of the European pigmy sorrel moth, but more usually 3.5–10 mm. The wings of adult moths are narrow and lanceolate, sometimes with metallic markings, and with the venation very simplified compared to most other moths.

The minute larvae usually are leaf miners but some species also mine seeds or bark of trees. Much is known about their host plants. The Pectinivalvinae, characterised by a "pectinifer" on the valve of the male genitalia, are endemic to Australia, where they mine the leaves of the tree families Myrtaceae (Scoble, 1983) or Cunoniaceae (Eucryphiaceae), and Elaeocarpaceae (Hoare, 2000). This Australian group probably constitutes the sister group of other pigmy moths (the subfamily Nepticulinae), which is distributed around the world except Antarctica (Davis, 1999). Many species undoubtedly await description, especially in tropical areas.

Typical nepticulid moth leaf mines referable to the genera Stigmella and Ectoedemia are known from mid-Cretaceous fossils around 97 million years old.

References

Further reading
Davis, D.R. (1999). The Monotrysian Heteroneura. Ch. 6, pp. 65–90 in Kristensen, N.P. (Ed.). Lepidoptera, Moths and Butterflies. Volume 1: Evolution, Systematics, and Biogeography. Handbuch der Zoologie. Eine Naturgeschichte der Stämme des Tierreiches / Handbook of Zoology. A Natural History of the phyla of the Animal Kingdom. Band / Volume IV Arthropoda: Insecta Teilband / Part 35: 491 pp. Walter de Gruyter, Berlin, New York.
Hoare, R.J.B. (2000). A new genus of primitive Nepticulidae (Lepidoptera) from eastern Australia, with a revised diagnosis of nepticulid subfamilies. Zoological Journal of the Linnean Society, 128(3): 289–317.
Labandeira, C.C., Dilcher, D.L., Davis, D.R. and Wagner, D.L. 1994. Ninety-Seven Million Years of Angiosperm-Insect Association: Paleobiological Insights into the Meaning of Coevolution. Proceedings of the National Academy of Sciences of the United States of America, 91(25): 12278–12282. pdf 
Puplesis, R., Diskus, A., Robinson, G.S. and Onore, G. (2002). A review and checklist of the Neotropical Nepticulidae (Lepidoptera). Bulletin of the Natural History Museum. Entomology Series, 71: 59–76.
Scoble, M.J. (1983). A revised cladistic classification of the Nepticulidae (Lepidoptera) with descriptions of new taxa mainly from South Africa. Monographs of the Transvaal Museum.

External links
iNaturalist
Nepticulidae and Opostegidae of the world
Tree of Life
Australian Nepticulidae
US Leaf mines
UK leaf mines
New Zealand species
Swedish species
UK species
Belgian species
List of available generic names
Watson, L., and Dallwitz, M.J. 2003 onwards. British insects: the families of Lepidoptera. Version: 29 December 2011 Detailed description and figures including wing venation.

 
Leaf miners